Bullock County School District  is a school district in Bullock County, Alabama, United States.

Statewide testing ranks the schools in Alabama. Those in the bottom six percent are listed as "failing." As of early 2018, Bullock County High School was included in this category.

Schools 

 Bullock County High School
 South Highlands Middle School
 Bullock County Career Technical Center
 Union Springs Elementary School

References

External links
 

Education in Bullock County, Alabama
School districts in Alabama